Uryupinsk is a town in Volgograd Oblast, Russia, located  northwest of Volgograd on the Khopyor River. Population:

Etymology
There are two theories of the historical background for the town's name. One is that it is from name of a Tartar prince Uryup, who got bogged down in a swamp near this location, during a fight with Yermak and got captured. Another is that it is from either the family name Uryupin or the word "". According to the 1866 Explanatory Dictionary of the Living Great Russian Language by Vladimir Dal, this archaic word means untidy person, which probably in this context characterizes not a person, but the swampy area.

The name of this town is known to many Russian people as a synonym for "backwater town". This usage became widespread after the popular Soviet film Destiny of a Man. The film was based on a short story by Mikhail Sholokhov, and Uryupinsk was the place of the action, shown as an inconspicuous provincial town.

History
Founded in the late 14th–early 15th century as Uryupin, it was a border outpost of the Principality of Ryazan, populated by Don Cossacks. Since 1857, it is the stanitsa Uryupinskaya and home of Pokrovskaya Fair, a center for trade on the southeastern side of the East European Plain. It was renamed Uryupinsk and granted town status in 1929.

It is assumed that it is listed in the historical List of Ruthenian Cities Far and Near under the name "Uryupesk" (Урюпеск).

Administrative and municipal status
Within the framework of administrative divisions, Uryupinsk serves as the administrative center of Uryupinsky District, even though it is not a part of it. As an administrative division, it is incorporated separately as the "town of oblast significance of Uryupinsk"—an administrative unit with the status equal to that of the districts. As a municipal division, the town of oblast significance of Uryupinsk is incorporated as Uryupinsk Urban Okrug.

Economy and industry

Uryupinsk is an industrial center with heavy industries such as agricultural machinery (harvesting machines) and loading equipment (a large crane-making plant is located here). The city also contains factories of light industry production (such as knitted fabric, shoe fabric, and furniture fabric), paper production plant, and a packing plant.

Another major industry involving the outlying areas of the town is goat farming and goat leather production. Because of its mild southern climate, the region is a good area for agriculture, and there are many agricultural processing factories in the region, specializing mainly in beef, oil and butter production.

References

Notes

Sources

Cities and towns in Volgograd Oblast
Don Host Oblast